Ivaylo Kirov (16 February 1947 – 26 February 2010) was a Bulgarian basketball player. He competed in the men's tournament at the 1968 Summer Olympics.

References

1947 births
2010 deaths
Bulgarian men's basketball players
Olympic basketball players of Bulgaria
Basketball players at the 1968 Summer Olympics
Basketball players from Sofia